Presidential Policy Directive 41 (PPD-41) titled "United States Cyber Incident Coordination" is a Presidential Policy Directive signed by President of the United States Barack Obama on 26 July 2016. Its annex has subject "Federal Government Coordination Architecture for Significant Cyber Incidents".

Invocation
Directive 41 was invoked several times by the Obama administration, to address threats to national cybersecurity.

The succeeding Trump administration, which took office in January 2017, did not invoke the directive at all until 15 December 2020. On that occasion, PPD-41 was invoked in a statement by the National Security Council announcing the creation of a Cyber Unified Coordination Group "to ensure continued unity of effort across the United States Government" in response to the 2020 United States federal government data breach.

References

Obama administration initiatives
United States national security policy
United States national security directives